Fleita is a surname. Notable people with the surname include:

 Jonatan Fleita (born 1995), Argentine footballer
 Juan Ramón Fleita (born 1972), Argentine footballer

See also
 Fleitas
 Fleitz